Katarina Manić (Serbian Cyrillic: Катарина Манић; born October 11, 1980) is a Serbian women's basketball player. 

Katarina Manić is now a geography teacher at the "Dositej Obradović" Elementary School in Niš.

External links
Profile at eurobasket.com

1980 births
Living people
People from Pirot
Serbian women's basketball players
Point guards
ŽKK Crvena zvezda players